Fowler–Noll–Vo (or FNV) is a non-cryptographic hash function created by Glenn Fowler, Landon Curt Noll, and Kiem-Phong Vo.

The basis of the FNV hash algorithm was taken from an idea sent as reviewer comments to the IEEE POSIX P1003.2 committee by Glenn Fowler and Phong Vo in 1991. In a subsequent ballot round, Landon Curt Noll improved on their algorithm. In an email message to Landon, they named it the Fowler/Noll/Vo or FNV hash.

Overview
The current versions are FNV-1 and FNV-1a, which supply a means of creating non-zero FNV offset basis.  FNV currently comes in 32-, 64-, 128-, 256-, 512-, and 1024-bit variants.  For pure FNV implementations, this is determined solely by the availability of FNV primes for the desired bit length; however, the FNV webpage discusses methods of adapting one of the above versions to a smaller length that may  or may not be a power of two.

The FNV hash algorithms and reference FNV source code have been released into the public domain.

The Python programming language previously used a modified version of the FNV scheme for its default hash function. From Python 3.4, FNV has been replaced with SipHash to resist "hash flooding" denial-of-service attacks.

FNV is not a cryptographic hash.

The hash

One of FNV's key advantages is that it is very simple to implement.  Start with an initial hash value of FNV offset basis.  For each byte in the input, multiply hash by the FNV prime, then XOR it with the byte from the input.  The alternate algorithm, FNV-1a, reverses the multiply and XOR steps.

FNV-1 hash

The FNV-1 hash algorithm is as follows:

 algorithm fnv-1 is
     hash := FNV_offset_basis
 
     for each byte_of_data to be hashed do
         hash := hash × FNV_prime
         hash := hash XOR byte_of_data
 
     return hash 

In the above pseudocode, all variables are unsigned integers.  All variables, except for byte_of_data, have the same number of bits as the FNV hash.  The variable, byte_of_data, is an 8 bit unsigned integer.

As an example, consider the 64-bit FNV-1 hash:

 All variables, except for byte_of_data, are 64-bit unsigned integers.
 The variable, byte_of_data, is an 8-bit unsigned integer.
 The FNV_offset_basis is the 64-bit FNV offset basis value: 14695981039346656037 (in hex, 0xcbf29ce484222325).
 The FNV_prime is the 64-bit FNV prime value: 1099511628211 (in hex, 0x100000001b3).
 The multiply returns the lower 64-bits of the product.
 The XOR is an 8-bit operation that modifies only the lower 8-bits of the hash value.
 The hash value returned is a 64-bit unsigned integer.

FNV-1a hash

The FNV-1a hash differs from the FNV-1 hash by only the order in which the multiply and XOR is performed:

 algorithm fnv-1a is
     hash := FNV_offset_basis
 
     for each byte_of_data to be hashed do
         hash := hash XOR byte_of_data
         hash := hash × FNV_prime
 
     return hash 
The above pseudocode has the same assumptions that were noted for the FNV-1 pseudocode.  The change in order leads to slightly better avalanche characteristics.

FNV-0 hash (deprecated)
The FNV-0 hash differs from the FNV-1 hash only by the initialisation value of the hash variable:

 algorithm fnv-0 is
     hash := 0
 
     for each byte_of_data to be hashed do
         hash := hash × FNV_prime
         hash := hash XOR byte_of_data
 
     return hash

The above pseudocode has the same assumptions that were noted for the FNV-1 pseudocode.

A consequence of the initialisation of the hash to 0 is that empty messages and all messages consisting of only the byte 0, regardless of their length, hash to 0.

Use of the FNV-0 hash is deprecated except for the computing of the FNV offset basis for use as the FNV-1 and FNV-1a hash parameters.

FNV offset basis

There are several different FNV offset basis for various bit lengths.  These FNV offset basis are computed by computing the FNV-0 from the following 32 octets when expressed in ASCII:
 chongo <Landon Curt Noll> /\../\
which is one of Landon Curt Noll's signature lines.  This is the only current practical use for the deprecated FNV-0.

FNV prime

An FNV prime is a prime number and is determined as follows:

For a given :
  (i.e., s is an integer)
 

where  is:
 

and where  is:
 
NOTE:  is the floor function

then the n-bit FNV prime is the smallest prime number  that is of the form:

such that:
 
 

Experimentally, FNV prime matching the above constraints tend to have better dispersion properties. They improve the polynomial feedback characteristic when an FNV prime multiplies an intermediate hash value. As such, the hash values produced are more scattered throughout the n-bit hash space.

FNV hash parameters

The above FNV prime constraints and the definition of the FNV offset basis yield the following table of FNV hash parameters:

Non-cryptographic hash

The FNV hash was designed for fast hash table and checksum use, not cryptography. The authors have identified the following properties as making the algorithm unsuitable as a cryptographic hash function:

 Speed of computation – As a hash designed primarily for hashtable and checksum use, FNV-1 and FNV-1a were designed to be fast to compute. However, this same speed makes finding specific hash values (collisions) by brute force faster.
 Sticky state – Being an iterative hash based primarily on multiplication and XOR, the algorithm is sensitive to the number zero. Specifically, if the hash value were to become zero at any point during calculation, and the next byte hashed were also all zeroes, the hash would not change. This makes colliding messages trivial to create given a message that results in a hash value of zero at some point in its calculation. Additional operations, such as the addition of a third constant prime on each step, can mitigate this but may have detrimental effects on avalanche effect or random distribution of hash values.
 Diffusion – The ideal secure hash function is one in which each byte of input has an equally-complex effect on every bit of the hash. In the FNV hash, the ones place (the rightmost bit) is always the XOR of the rightmost bit of every input byte. This can be mitigated by XOR-folding (computing a hash twice the desired length, and then XORing the bits in the "upper half" with the bits in the "lower half").

See also
 Bloom filter (application for fast hashes) 
 Non-cryptographic hash functions

References

External links
 Landon Curt Noll's webpage on FNV (with table of base & prime parameters)
 Internet draft by Fowler, Noll, Vo, and Eastlake (IETF Informational Internet Draft)

Hash function (non-cryptographic)
Public-domain software with source code